The following list includes notable people who were born or have lived in Rutland, Vermont, United States.

Academics and writing 

 Julia C. R. Dorr, author; resident of Rutland

 Joy Hakim, history writer
 Mary McGarry Morris, novelist
 John Martin Thomas, ninth president of Middlebury College, ninth president of Penn State, and twelfth president of Rutgers University; resident of Rutland
 Charles E. Tuttle, publisher

Business 

 James E. Burke, CEO of Johnson & Johnson
 John Deere, industrialist
 George E. Royce, pioneer of marble quarrying industry, state senator

Military 

 Francis William Billado, Major General and Adjutant General of the Vermont National Guard
 Barry M. Costello, US Navy vice admiral
 Merritt A. Edson, US Marine Corps major general
 Frederic Williams Hopkins, Adjutant General of the Vermont National Guard, 1837–1852
 Daniel Murray, Loyalist Major for the British during the American Revolutionary War
 Edward H. Ripley, American Civil War Brevet Brigadier General, brother of William Y. W. Ripley
 William Y. W. Ripley, American Civil War recipient of the Medal of Honor
 Leonard F. Wing, National Guard major general who commanded the 43rd Infantry Division in World War II
 John E. Woodward, U.S. Army brigadier general

Music 

 Aaron Lewis, lead guitarist and founding member of Staind
 Dan Tyminski, bluegrass composer, vocalist and instrumentalist

Politics 

 Horace W. Bailey, U.S. Marshal for Vermont
 Edward L. Burke, U.S. Marshal for Vermont
 Fred M. Butler, Associate Justice of the Vermont Supreme Court
 Frank H. Chapman, U.S. Marshal for Vermont
 Percival W. Clement, 57th Governor of Vermont
 Thomas W. Costello, state representative
 Walter C. Dunton, Justice of the Vermont Supreme Court
 Fred A. Field, U.S. Marshal for Vermont
 Henry F. Field, Vermont State Treasurer
 George Tisdale Hodges, U.S. congressman
 Steven Howard, state representative
 William Brown Ide (1796–1852), state legislator, central figure in California's Bear Flag Revolt of 1846, named President of the Republic of California
 Jim Jeffords, U.S. senator
 Olin M. Jeffords, Chief Justice of the Vermont Supreme Court, father of Senator Jim Jeffords
Lawrence C. Jones, Vermont Attorney General
 Charles Linsley, Vermont attorney and politician
Kevin J. Mullin, member of the Vermont House of Representatives and Vermont Senate
 John Prout, Justice of the Vermont Supreme Court
Joseph F. Radigan, United States Attorney for Vermont
Israel Smith (1759–1810), member of the United States House of Representatives; member of the United States Senate; Governor of Vermont; resident of Rutland
Milford K. Smith, Associate Justice of the Vermont Supreme Court
 Bert L. Stafford, mayor of Rutland
 Robert Stafford, U.S. congressman and senator; 71st Governor of Vermont
 Richard C. Thomas, Secretary of State of Vermont
 Charles K. Williams, Chief Justice of the Vermont Supreme Court 1834–1846; Governor of Vermont 1850–1852; raised in Rutland

Sports 

 Rick Chaffee, Olympic ski racer
 Suzy Chaffee, Olympic ski racer and actress
 Andrea Mead Lawrence, first American to win two Olympic gold medals in skiing
 Arlie Pond, pitcher for the Baltimore Orioles
 Steve Wisniewski, guard and assistant offensive line coach for the Los Angeles/Oakland Raiders

Television and film 

 David Franzoni, Oscar-winning writer and producer of film Gladiator
 David Giancola, filmmaker; born in Rutland
 Carlene King Johnson, Miss Vermont USA 1955, Miss USA 1955

Fictional residents 

 Fitzgerald Thomas Grant III, President of the United States on the TV series Scandal; has a house in Rutland
 Master Pandemonium, comic book villain
 Snow Job, character from G.I. Joe

References

Rutland, Vermont
Rutland